Fabio Mechetti (born 27 August 1957, São Paulo) is a Brazilian conductor.

Biography
Mechetti has master's degrees in conducting and composition from the Juilliard School of Music.  He won the 1989 Malko International Conducting Competition in Denmark.  In the United States, Mechetti has served as associate conductor of the National Symphony Orchestra (Washington, D.C.) and resident conductor of the San Diego Symphony.  He has been music director of the Syracuse Symphony Orchestra (1992–1999), the Spokane Symphony (1993–2004), and the Jacksonville Symphony (1999–2014).  With the Spokane Symphony, Mechetti has the title of conductor laureate.  With the Jacksonville Symphony, he has the title of conductor emeritus.

In 2008, Mechetti became the founding music director and principal conductor of the Orquestra Filarmônica de Minas Gerais in Belo Horizonte.  He served as principal conductor of the Malaysian Philharmonic Orchestra for the 2014–2015 season, and stood down from this post in October 2015.

Mechetti has two daughters, Marina and Carolina.

References

External links
 Official website of Fabio Mechetti
 Schmidt Artists International agency page on Fabio Mechetti

Brazilian conductors (music)
Living people
21st-century conductors (music)
1957 births